The following is a list of all 460 members of the lower People's Representative Council of the Republic of Indonesia for the period 1971–1977, resulting from the legislative elections held in 1971. Members of the People's Representative Council were sworn in on 28 October 1992, and represented 10 different parties. Though this was until the merging of the parties in 1973, which resulted on only 3 parties being represented.

Leadership

Speaker

Deputy speakers

Members

By province

Central Java

Jakarta

Notes

References

Bibliography 

 Memperkenalkan anggota-anggota Dewan Perwakilan Rakjat hasil pemilihan umum 1971. Indonesia: Lembaga Pemilihan Umum. 1971.
Dewan Perwakilan Rakyat periode 1971-1977 (PDF). People's Representative Council. 1983.

People's Representative Council
Elections in Indonesia
Lists of members of the People's Representative Council